This is a list of members of the Tasmanian Legislative Council between 1885 and 1891. Terms of the Legislative Council did not coincide with Legislative Assembly elections, and members served six-year terms, with a number of members facing election each year.

Elections

Members

Notes

  On 20 November 1885, following the creation of the seat of Russell in north-western Tasmania, William Moore, the member for Mersey, transferred to the seat. His old seat was filled by James Smith.
  In December 1885, a redistribution of the Council occurred.
 The Longford division was renamed Westmorland. The member for Longford, William Dodery, was unaffected.
 The Jordan division was abolished and largely recreated as Macquarie; the member for Jordan, James Agnew, was required to stand for an extraordinary election on 18 February 1886, at which he was reelected.
 A new two-member division of Launceston was created while Tamar changed from a two-member to a single-member division.
  When the second seat in Tamar was abolished, the incumbent, James Aikenhead, retired. At the resulting Launceston by-election on 21 December 1895, William Hart was elected.
  In February 1886, Adye Douglas, the member for South Esk, resigned. James Gibson won the resulting by-election on 26 March 1886.
  An extraordinary election for the second Launceston seat was declared for 13 July 1886. Tamar MHA John Scott resigned to contest it, and hence by-elections for both Tamar and Launceston were required. Scott was elected in Launceston, whilst Audley Coote was elected in Tamar.
  In January 1886, Thomas Smart, one of the three members for Hobart, resigned. George Salier won the resulting by-election on 8 February 1886.
  Shortly after his Government's defeat on 29 March 1887, the Premier of Tasmania and member for Macquarie, James Agnew, retired from politics. Alfred Page won the resulting by-election on 26 July 1887.
  On 13 January 1890, John Lord, the member for Cambridge, died. Alfred Lord was elected unopposed on 29 January 1890.
  On 3 June 1890, John Scott, one of the two members for Launceston, died. Sir Adye Douglas was elected unopposed on 17 June 1890.
  On 19 March 1891, William Hodgson, the member for Pembroke, died. Henry Lamb won the resulting by-election on 14 April 1891.

Sources
 
 Parliament of Tasmania (2006). The Parliament of Tasmania from 1856

Members of Tasmanian parliaments by term
19th-century Australian politicians